Springs of Life (春到人间) is a Singaporean Chinese drama which aired in 2002. It was produced following the success of Wok of Life. Unusual for a locally produced period drama at that time, the theme song's introduction is in a rock and roll style.

Synopsis
The story begins in the 1950s and spans about three decades. A young entrepreneur Dapao is on a quest to learn the secret of a special medicinal oil in hopes of striking the jackpot. Meanwhile, a pair of singing sisters try to make their way in showbiz.

Cast
Chew Chor Meng as Cai Dapao 蔡大炮
Sharon Au as Su Feifei 苏菲菲
Li-Lin as Su Fangfang 苏芳芳
Huang Wenyong as Su Hua 苏华
Alan Tern as Cai Daming 蔡大鸣
Carole Lin as Cai Daxiao 蔡大笑
Chen Shucheng as Cai Baijia 蔡百佳
Yan Bingliang as Cai Bailiang 蔡百良
Cheng Pei-pei as Yun Shuheng 云书恒
Priscelia Chan
Chen Hanwei
Jin Yinji as Grandma Wu 巫婆婆
Lin Meijiao
Ye Shipin
Mai Haowei
Cavin Soh
Brandon Wong
Liu Qiulian as Xiannü 仙女
Bryan Chan as Physician Yang
Liang Tian as Physician Chen

Reception
Springs of Life was extremely popular and broke the record held by Love Me, Love Me Not for viewership ratings.

Notes
The 2012 anniversary drama Joys of Life (花样人间) follows a similar theme to Springs of Life and Wok of Life and also stars Chew Chor Meng and Huang Wenyong. Only Chew has starred in all three dramas. Unlike many typical period dramas produced by MediaCorp such as The Awakening or The Little Nyonya, these "ren jian" (人间) period dramas are much more lighthearted and humorous.
Many veteran artistes from the SBC and TCS era made guest appearances or were part of the supporting cast, such as Madeline Chu (朱乐玲) and Tammy Chow (周黛兰). Veteran Chinese actress Cheng Pei-pei also joined the cast.

2003 Accolades
The Star Awards 2003 was generally dominated by another popular long-running drama Holland V  but Springs of Life managed several nominations.

References

External links
Springs of Life (English) on MediaCorp website
Springs of Life 春到人间 (Chinese) on MediaCorp website

Singapore Chinese dramas
2002 Singaporean television series debuts
Channel 8 (Singapore) original programming